The Nokia 3.2 is a Nokia-branded entry-level smartphone released 21 May 2019 running the Android operating system.

Models 
The phone comes in 3 variants: the 2/16 GB,3/32 GB and 3/64 GB storages, and have two colour variants the gray & black.

Design 
The phone has a plastic body. It has dual sim support and a screen to body ratio of ~80.5%

Reference List 

3.2
Mobile phones introduced in 2019
Discontinued smartphones